Valeriya Romanovna Pogrebnyak (born 25 August 1998) is an inactive Russian tennis player.

Pogrebnyak has a career high WTA singles ranking of 885 achieved on 10 October 2016. She also has a career high WTA doubles ranking of 638 achieved on 31 August 2015.

Pogrebnyak made her WTA main draw debut at the 2018 St. Petersburg Ladies' Trophy in the doubles draw partnering Elena Rybakina.

ITF Circuit finals

Doubles: 1 (1 title)

References

External links
 
 

1998 births
Living people
Russian female tennis players
21st-century Russian women
20th-century Russian women